Noel Stanton (25 December 1926 – 20 May 2009) was the founder of the Jesus Army.

Life

Stanton was born in Bedfordshire in the East of England, and educated at Bedford Modern School.  His parents were farmers. When he was 18, he was conscripted into British military service with the Royal Navy. The navy sent him to Sydney, Australia, where he was approached by evangelist Frank Jenner, who asked him, "If you should die tonight, where would you go?  Would it be heaven or hell?" Stanton felt convicted for several months afterwards and consequently converted to Christianity the next year.

In 1957, he became the pastor of a Baptist church in Bugbrooke, Northamptonshire. Under Stanton's leadership, the church took on characteristics of the Charismatic Movement and then of the 1960s counterculture. In 1973, he began turning the church into an intentional community modelled after early Christianity, and the resulting movement became the Jesus Army. He wrote the book Your Baptism Into Jesus Christ and His Church, which was published in 1998. Stanton remained the Jesus Army's leader until 2009, when he named Mick Haines the new leader before dying on 20 May.

After Stanton's death in 2009, the Jesus Army supplied allegations to Northamptonshire Police of sexual offences against Stanton and others, and as of 2019 there are 43 complainants of historic sexual and physical abuse.

References

Further reading 

 
 
 
 
 
 
 
 

1926 births
2009 deaths
Military personnel from Bedfordshire
Royal Navy sailors
People from Bedfordshire
People educated at Bedford Modern School
20th-century English Baptist ministers
British New Church Movement
English Charismatics
Christian revivalists
English Christian religious leaders
Converts to Protestantism from atheism or agnosticism
Counterculture communities
Christian communities
Royal Navy personnel of World War II
People from Bugbrooke